Erica Messer is an American television writer, producer, and story editor.  She has written episodes of television series such as Alias, The O.C., Charmed, and Criminal Minds.  She has also co-produced two television shows: Charmed and Criminal Minds, as well as acting as a story editor on Alias and executive story editor on The O.C.

Career
Messer began her career with the television series Alias in 2001 as a screenwriter. In 2002, she was promoted to story editor on Alias. Messer, then in 2003–04, wrote several episodes for The O.C. and serving as executive story editor. She wrote one episode for Charmed in 2004. From 2004–05, Messer was the co-producer of Charmed. From 2005 to the present, she has been with the television series Criminal Minds as a screenwriter, producer, supervising producer, and executive producer. In 2010, Messer was named co-showrunner. In 2011, she was named sole showrunner. In 2013, Messer re-signed her contract with Criminal Minds. In 2014, CBS was looking for a spin-off. In 2015, Messer wrote the backdoor pilot episode "Beyond Borders" in the tenth season of Criminal Minds for which the spin-off Criminal Minds: Beyond Borders was created. Messer has also co-written multiple episodes of Criminal Minds with star Kirsten Vangsness.

Filmography

Television credits

Production credits

References

External links
 
 

American television producers
American women television producers
American television writers
Living people
Year of birth missing (living people)
Place of birth missing (living people)
American women television writers
21st-century American screenwriters
21st-century American women writers